Phytoncides are antimicrobial allelochemic  volatile organic compounds derived from plants. The word, which means "exterminated by the plant", was coined in 1928 by Dr. Boris P. Tokin, a Russian biochemist from Leningrad University. He found that some plants give off very active substances that help to prevent them from rotting or being eaten by some insects and animals.

Occurrence and function 
Cedar, garlic, locust, oak, onion, pine, tea tree, many spices, and many other plants give off phytoncides. Garlic contains allicin and diallyl disulfide. Pine contains alpha-pinene, carene, myrcene, and other terpenes. Sophora flavescens contains sophoraflavanone G. 

More than 5,000 volatile substances defend plants that protect them from bacteria, fungi, and insects. Phytoncides work by inhibiting or preventing the growth of the attacking organism.

Use
They are widely used in Russian, Ukrainian, Korean, Chinese, and Japanese medicine, as well as in alternative medicine, aromatherapy, and veterinary medicine.

References
 J. Jung "Antibakterielle und antifungale Hemmstoffe in höheren Pflanzen Literaturübersicht" – in Journal Forstwissenschaftliches Centralblatt  Publisher Springer Berlin / Heidelberg ISSN 0015-8003 (Print) Issue Volume 83, Numbers 11–12 / November, 1964 pages 358–374 
 Tambiev AKh, Agaverdiev ASh. "The ability of volatile fractions of certain phytoncide-forming compounds to increase the chemiluminescence of oleic acid" Biofizika. 1966; 11(1):17–57. (in Russian)  
 MULLER-DIETZ H. "Phytoncides and phytoncide therapy", Dtsch Med Wochenschr. 1956 Jun 15;81(24):983–4. (Article in German)
 "The phytoncide activity of several varieties of garlic stored for different periods of time" Vopr Pitan. 1974 Nov–Dec;(6):61–2. (in Russian)
 Li Q, Nakadai A, Matsushima H, Miyazaki Y, Krensky AM, Kawada T, Morimoto K. "Phytoncides (wood essential oils) induce human natural killer cell activity." Immunopharmacol Immunotoxicol. 2006;28(2):319–33.
 Li Q, Kobayashi M, Wakayama Y, Inagaki H, Katsumata M, Hirata Y, Hirata K, Shimizu T, Kawada T, Park BJ, Ohira T, Kagawa T, Miyazaki Y. "Effect of phytoncide from trees on human natural killer cell function." Int J Immunopathol Pharmacol. 2009 Oct–Dec;22(4):951–9.
 Li Q, Morimoto K, Kobayashi M, Inagaki H, Katsumata M, Hirata Y, Hirata K, Shimizu T, Li YJ, Wakayama Y, Kawada T, Ohira T, Takayama N, Kagawa T, Miyazaki Y. "A forest bathing trip increases human natural killer activity and expression of anti-cancer proteins in female subjects." J Biol Regul Homeost Agents. 2008 Jan–Mar;22(1):45–55.
 Li Q, Morimoto K, Kobayashi M, Inagaki H, Katsumata M, Hirata Y, Hirata K, Suzuki H, Li YJ, Wakayama Y, Kawada T, Park BJ, Ohira T, Matsui N, Kagawa T, Miyazaki Y, Krensky AM. "Visiting a forest, but not a city, increases human natural killer activity and expression of anti-cancer proteins." Int J Immunopathol Pharmacol. 2008 Jan–Mar;21(1):117–27.

Phytochemicals
Biologically-based therapies